Drunk History is a British comedy television series that premiered on Comedy Central on 12 January 2015. It is based on the American television series of the same name. In each episode, a celebrity (usually a comedian) struggles to recount a historical event while intoxicated. Their account is then reconstructed by actors. The show is narrated by Jimmy Carr.

The second series began broadcasting in February 2016. A special edition featuring Holly Hagan and Gaz Beadle from the MTV show Geordie Shore was broadcast on MTV on 23 February 2016.

The third series began airing on 8 March 2017 at 10pm on Comedy Central UK.

Episodes

Series 1

Series 2

Series 3

Specials

References

External links

2010s British comedy television series
2015 British television series debuts
2017 British television series endings
Television series featuring reenactments
Television series based on Internet-based works
2010s British television sketch shows
British television series based on American television series
Television series by Tiger Aspect Productions
Television series by Endemol
English-language television shows